This is a list of cricket grounds in Australia. The list includes all grounds that have been used for Test, One Day International, Twenty20 International, first-class, List A and domestic Twenty20 cricket matches. Grounds that have hosted international cricket games are listed in bold. The Sydney Cricket Ground has hosted the most first-class games in Australia, with 655 games as of the 2010–11 season. The Melbourne Cricket Ground has hosted the most List A games, with 228, and the Adelaide Oval and the WACA Ground have both hosted 16 Twenty20 games. The Melbourne Cricket Ground has hosted 884 games overall, an Australian record.

Australian Capital Territory

New South Wales

Northern Territory

Queensland

South Australia

Tasmania

Victoria
{| class="wikitable sortable"
|-
! Ground Name !! Location !! First Used !! Last Used !! First-Class Games !! List A Games !!  Twenty20 Games !! Notes
|-
| Emerald Hill Cricket Ground || Melbourne || 1851–52 || 1851–52 || 1 || 0 || 0 || Hosted second first-class game in Australia. No longer exists.
|-
| Melbourne Cricket Ground || Melbourne || 1855–56 || current || 663 || 245 || 32 || Hosted Test, ODI and Twenty20 International cricket.
|-
| East Melbourne Cricket Ground || Melbourne || 1880–81 || 1888–89 || 4 || 0 || 0 || Closed in 1921 and demolished.
|-
| Lakeside Stadium || Melbourne || 1907–08 || 1931–32 || 2 || 0 || 0 || Also hosted a Women's ODI game. Converted to a soccer stadium.
|-
| Brunswick Street Oval || Melbourne || 1925–26 || 1925–26  || 1 || 0 || 0 || 
|-
| Punt Road Oval || Melbourne || 1932–33 || 2001–02 || 6 || 5 || 0 || Located next to the MCG. Also hosted Women's Test and Women's ODI matches. 
|-
| Princes Park || Melbourne || 1945–46 || 1997–98 || 7 || 2 || 0 || 
|-
| Junction Oval || Melbourne || 1945–46 || current || 41 || 9 || 1 || Hosted the 2008–09 Sheffield Shield Final. Also hosted Women's Test, Women's ODI and Youth Test matches. 
|-
| Waverley Park || Melbourne || 1979–80 || 1979–80 || 0 || 1 || 0 || Also hosted twenty World Series Cricket matches. No longer exists.
|-
| Wangaratta Showgrounds || Wangaratta || 1986–87 || 2005–06 || 2 || 1 || 0 || 
|-
| Sale Oval || Sale || 1989–90 || 1989–90 || 1 || 0 || 0 ||
|-
| Eastern Oval || Ballarat || 1990–91 || 2004–05 || 1 || 4 || 0 || Hosted one ODI during the 1992 World Cup.
|-
| Queen Elizabeth Oval || Bendigo || 1991–92 || 2012–13 || 3 || 1 || 0 || Hosted a Women's Test match.
|-
| Docklands Stadium || Melbourne || 2000–01 || current || 0 || 12 || 12 || 
|-
| Albert Cricket Ground || Melbourne || 2002–03 || 2002–03 || 0 || 0* || 0 || One List A match was abandoned due to rain
|-
| Central Reserve || Melbourne || 2005–06 || 2005–06 || 0 || 1 || 0 || 
|-
| Deakin Reserve || Shepparton || 2005–06 || 2005–06 || 0 || 1 || 0 || Also hosted Youth Test and ODI matches. 
|-
| Traralgon Showgrounds || Traralgon || 2007–08 || 2007–08 || 0 || 1 || 0 || 
|- 
| Ted Summerton Reserve || Moe || 2018–19 || Current || 0 || 0  || 1 ||  
|-
| Geelong Cricket Ground || Geelong || 2010–11 || 2010–11 || 0 || 1 || 0 || Built to replace Kardinia Park as a cricket venue. 
|-
|Kardinia Park
|Geelong
|2016–17
|Current
|0
|0
|1
|Updated 19/02/2017
|-
| Aberfeldie Park || Melbourne || 1977–78 || 1984–85 || || || || Hosted several Women's ODI matches.
|-
| Arden Street Oval || Melbourne  || || || || || || Hosted single Women's Test match.
|-
| Melbourne Grammar School' || Melbourne || || || || || || Hosted single Women's ODI match. 
|}

Match totals current up to 21 April 2014 (except Kardinia Park; See Notes section)

Western Australia

Top 10 most games hostedTotal matches held'' refers to the combined number of first-class, List A and Twenty20 matches held at one ground.

See also

List of Test cricket grounds – Full international list
List of Australian Football League grounds
List of ice rinks in Australia
List of indoor arenas in Australia
List of National Basketball League (Australia) venues
List of Australian rugby league stadiums
List of Australian rugby union stadiums
List of soccer stadiums in Australia
List of Oceanian stadiums by capacity

References

External links
Grounds in Australia – CricketArchive
Australian Cricket Grounds – ESPN Cricinfo
HowSTAT! Grounds List

Cricket grounds in Australia
Gro
Australia